San Giovanni in Canale is a Gothic-style Roman Catholic church in central Piacenza, formerly associated with a Dominican monastery.

History
The Dominican order arrived in Piacenza in 1220 and donations from those living next to the Rio Beverora (an Ancient Roman canal that flowed into the Po River, allowed them to establish their base here, and while they dedicated the church to St John, this church was called “in canale” to distinguish it from a similarly dedicated temple. This Dominican complex once housed the Inquisition tribunal. The structure, including the facade were rebuilt in 1522 in a Gothic style, with a large rose window. The church was suppressed by the French in 1797. The interior has 14th century tombs of the Scotti family. In the 16th and 17th centuries, the interior was decorated in Rococo style with stucco and gilding. The Chapel of the Rosary was decorated in the neoclassical style with large canvases by Gaspare Landi (Road to Calvary) and Vincenzo Camuccini (Presentation at the Temple).

References

Roman Catholic churches in Piacenza
14th-century Roman Catholic church buildings in Italy
Gothic architecture in Lombardy